Louder Than Hell is the debut comedy album from American stand-up comedian and actor Sam Kinison, released in 1986.

Track listing
The album contained the following tracks:

Blind
Big Menu
Libya
Relationships
Alphabet
Sexual Therapy
Manson
Jesus
Devil
World Hunger
Letter from Home
Love Song

References

1986 live albums
1986 debut albums
Sam Kinison albums
Warner Records live albums
1980s comedy albums